The Kapisanan ng mga Brodkaster ng Pilipinas (KBP) is a broadcast media organization in the Philippines which provides its members broadcasting standards. The KBP was organized on April 27, 1973 in order to promote professional and ethical standards in Philippine broadcasting both in radio and television.

The KBP provides broadcast media regulations and guidelines for news, public affairs and commentaries, political broadcasts, children's shows, religious programming, and including advertising to its members. The members of the KBP are composed of the owners and operators of radio and television stations including the radio and television stations themselves.

Broadcast code of the Philippines
The KBP’s Broadcast Code is a set of standards for performance and ethics to be  followed by member radio and television stations. The Code is in 3 parts: Part 1 includes the 33 articles of which the standards for programming are illustrated. Part 2 pertains to the implementing rules and regulations of the KBP, while Part 3 outlines the penalties for violations.

The 33 articles of Part 1 cover all broadcast media (radio and television) that are members of KBP. These mainly cover how programs such as news and publics affairs programs remain just, fair and unbiased in their views and opinions. The Code also states that news sources must be clearly identified, except when the sources meet a confidentiality condition. The Code provides correctional measures should a broadcast entity release non-factual information. The standards in the Code pertain to all types of programming and how these should be monitored when showing content that is sexual or violent. The KBP advocates the 18-minute advertising per hour rule for Philippine TV stations, the 18-minute rule was strictly implemented to prevent ads cluttering the TV programs.

The KBP Golden Dove Awards

Since 1990 the KBP has held the Golden Dove Awards, it is an annual awards recognition event which pays tribute to broadcast practitioners for their contributions and achievements in the broadcast industry. The judges for each of the categories are from selected media practitioners, advertisers and the academic community. As of the 17th Golden Dove Awards they have been giving away awards for the following categories:

	Broadcaster of the Year
	Lifetime Achievement Award
	Outstanding AM and FM Station
	Outstanding Comedy Program & Host
	Outstanding Drama Program & Host
	Outstanding Drama Series
	Outstanding Field Reporter
	Outstanding Game Show & Host
	Outstanding Magazine Program & Host
	Outstanding Magazine Talk Show & Host
	Outstanding Newscast Program & Host
	Outstanding Newscaster for Television & Radio
	Outstanding Public Affairs Program & Host
	Outstanding Public Announcement
	Outstanding Public Service Program Radio and TV Host
	Outstanding Radio Jock
	Outstanding Science and Technology Program  & Host
	Outstanding TV Station
	Outstanding Variety Show Program for both Manila and other provinces

Member stations
As of 2020, the Philippines has a total of 297 television broadcast stations from 173 in 1998. Currently there are also 659 FM stations and 383 AM stations this comprises regional subsidiaries and smaller entities in provinces which was based from the total National Telecommunications Commission (NTC) licenses distributed. Cable television (CATV) remains to be outside of the KBP's broadcast code but the programs are still reviewed by the Movie and Television Review and Classification Board of the Philippines (MTRCB).

Broadcast stations by region

KBP Chapters 
KBP is also composed of many local chapters in the country.

 KBP Kidapawan City Chapter
 KBP-MisOr CdeO chapter
 KBP Pangasinan Chapter 
 KBP CALABARZON or Region 4A Chapter is headed by Chapter Chairman Roy Bato 
 NOTE: Radio and Television stations in Central Luzon are also members of the Central Luzon Media Association (CLMA).

See also
Radio in the Philippines
Department of Information and Communications Technology (DICT)
Movie and Television Review and Classification Board (MTRCB)
National Telecommunications Commission (Philippines) (NTC)
Click Music Philippines
26th KBP Golden Dove Awards

References

External links
 Official website
 Broadcast code of the Philippines
 KBP CALABARZON Chapter

Mass media in the Philippines
Mass media companies of the Philippines
Mass media regulation
Broadcasting associations
Regulation in the Philippines
Advertising trade associations
Advertising in the Philippines
Organizations established in 1973